As of July 2020, a total of 61 Boeing 747 aircraft, or just under 4% of the total number of 747s built, first flown commercially in 1970, have been involved in accidents and incidents resulting in a hull loss, meaning that the aircraft was either destroyed or damaged beyond economical repair. Of the 61 Boeing 747 aircraft losses, 32 resulted in no loss of life; in one, a hostage was murdered; and in one, a terrorist died. Some of the aircraft that were declared damaged beyond economical repair were older 747s that sustained relatively minor damage. Had these planes been newer, repairing them might have been economically viable, although with the 747's increasing obsolescence, this is becoming less common. Some 747s have been involved in accidents resulting in the highest death toll of any civil aviation accident, the highest death toll of any single airplane accident, and the highest death toll of a midair collision. As with most airliner accidents, the root of cause(s) in these incidents involved a confluence of multiple factors that rarely could be ascribed to flaws with the 747's design or its flying characteristics.



1970s
 Pan Am Flight 93 was the first hull loss of a Boeing 747 (747-121), the result of terrorism after it was hijacked by the Popular Front for the Liberation of Palestine. On September 6, 1970, a new Pan American World Airways aircraft flying from Amsterdam to New York City was hijacked and flown first to Beirut, then to Cairo. Shortly after the occupants were evacuated from the aircraft after arriving at Cairo, it was blown up.
 Japan Airlines Flight 404, the second 747 hull loss, was very similar to the first. The aircraft was hijacked on a flight from Amsterdam to Anchorage, Alaska, on July 20, 1973, by the Popular Front for the Liberation of Palestine working with the Japanese Red Army. It flew to Dubai, then Damascus, before ending its journey at Benghazi. The occupants were released and the aircraft was blown up. One of the hijackers died.
 Lufthansa Flight 540 was the first fatal crash of a 747. On November 20, 1974, it stalled and crashed moments after taking off from Nairobi, with 59 deaths and 98 survivors. The cause was an error by the flight engineer in combination with a lack of a sufficient warning system.
 Air France Flight 193, a Boeing 747-128 (N28888) operating the sector between Bombay (now Mumbai) and Tel Aviv to Paris-Charles de Gaulle Airport, was destroyed by fire, June 12, 1975, on the ground at Bombay’s (now Mumbai’s) Santa Cruz Airport, following an aborted take-off, with no fatalities.
Imperial Iranian Air Force Flight ULF48, a 747 freighter, crashed near Madrid on May 9, 1976, due to the structural failure of its left wing in flight, killing the 17 people on board. The accident investigation determined that a lightning strike caused an explosion in a fuel tank in the wing, leading to flutter and the separation of the wing.
 On March 27, 1977, the deadliest aviation accident in history occurred when KLM Flight 4805 collided on the runway with Pan Am 1736 in heavy fog at Tenerife Airport, resulting in 583 fatalities. Both aircraft were 747s. The 61 survivors were all from the Pan Am 747. The Pan Am aircraft was the first 747 to enter commercial service.
 Air India Flight 855 crashed into the sea off the coast of Mumbai (formerly Bombay) on New Year's Day, 1978. All 213 passengers and crew died. The cause was lack of situational awareness on the captain's part after executing a banked turn.

1980s
 Korean Air Lines Flight 015, operating a flight from Los Angeles to Seoul, with a refueling stop at Anchorage, Alaska, was damaged beyond repair at landing on November 19, 1980. Of the 226 occupants, 15 passengers and crew died.
 On August 4, 1983, Pan Am Flight 73, a 747-100, struck a VASI light installation and its concrete base landing at Karachi International Airport, causing the nose gear to collapse backwards and to the left, resulting in total destruction of the VASI light installation and damage to the forward cargo hold, floor of the first class section, and the stairway leading to the upper deck. (Not to be confused with a later hijacking in 1986 of a Pan Am Flight 73.)
 On September 1, 1983, Korean Air Lines Flight 007, a 747-200B from New York City to Seoul via Anchorage, was shot down by the Soviet Air Force just west of Sakhalin Island while flying through prohibited airspace. All 269 passengers and crew were killed.
 On November 27, 1983, Avianca Flight 011, a 747-200 flying from Paris to Bogotá via Madrid, crashed into a mountainside due to a navigational error while maneuvering to land at Madrid Barajas International Airport, killing 181 of the 192 on board.
  On March 16, 1985, a UTA Boeing 747-300 (registration F-GDUA) was destroyed on the ground at Paris CDG when a fire was accidentally started while the aircraft's cabin was being cleaned.   
 On June 23, 1985, a bomb exploded on Air India Flight 182, a 747-200B en route from Montreal to New Delhi, causing the aircraft to explode and crash off the southwest coast of Ireland, killing all 329 on board. Until the September 11 attacks of 2001, the Air India bombing was the single deadliest terrorist attack involving aircraft. It remains the "worst mass murder in Canadian history."
 On August 12, 1985, Japan Airlines Flight 123 crashed when the rear pressure bulkhead of a 747SR flying from Tokyo to Osaka failed at cruising altitude, severing the aircraft's vertical stabilizer. The pilots kept it in the air for 32 minutes, but it eventually struck Mount Takamagahara and crashed. Of the 524 people on board, only four passengers survived, making it the deadliest-ever single-aircraft accident. The accident was caused by Boeing improperly repairing the tail strike suffered by the same aircraft seven years earlier.
 On December 2, 1985, Air France Flight 091 overshot the runway during a landing at Rio de Janeiro-Galeão International Airport, Brazil. No fatalities occurred, but the aircraft was damaged beyond repair.
 On November 28, 1987, South African Airways Flight 295, a 747-200BSCD "Combi" en route from Taipei to Johannesburg, crashed into the ocean off Mauritius after a fire broke out in the rear cargo hold, damaging vital control systems. All 159 people on board died.
 On December 21, 1988, Pan Am Flight 103, a 747-100, disintegrated in midair after a bomb in the luggage hold exploded; the wings, with their tanks full of fuel, landed on Lockerbie, Scotland. All 259 people on board and 11 people in Lockerbie died. A Libyan national was eventually convicted at a Scottish court sitting in the Netherlands of murder in connection with the bombing.
 on February 24, 1989, United Airlines Flight 811, a 747-100, which suffered an explosive decompression in mid-flight. killing 9 of 355.

1990s

On May 7, 1990, Air India Flight 132 touched down at Delhi-Indira Gandhi International Airport after a flight from London-Heathrow. On application of reverse thrust, a failure of the number-one engine pylon-to-wing attachment caused this engine to tilt nose down. Hot exhaust gasses caused a fire on the left wing. The aircraft, VT-EBO, was damaged beyond repair.

 British Airways Flight 149 was a 747-100 flying from London Heathrow Airport to Sultan Abdul Aziz Shah Airport, Kuala Lumpur, with stopovers in Kuwait International Airport and Madras International Airport (now Chennai). The aircraft landed in Kuwait City on August 1, 1990, four hours after the Gulf War broke out. All 385 passengers and crew were taken hostage by Iraqi forces; one was executed, but the others were released. The aircraft was subsequently blown up.
 On December 29, 1991, China Airlines Flight 358, a 747-200, crashed shortly after takeoff from Chiang Kai-shek International Airport in Taipei, Taiwan, killing all five crewmembers, when the number-three and number-four engines (the ones on the right wing) detached from the aircraft.
 On October 4, 1992, El Al Flight 1862, a 747-200F, crashed shortly after takeoff from Amsterdam Schiphol Airport after the right-side engines both fell off, due to metal fatigue, and damaged the right wing, killing all three crew members and the single passenger on board, as well as 39 people on the ground.
 On November 4, 1993, China Airlines Flight 605, a brand-new 747-400 from Taipei to Hong Kong Kai Tak Airport, landed  past the threshold on runway 13, with insufficient braking power. Unable to stop before the end of the runway, the captain steered the aircraft into Victoria Harbour. All passengers were evacuated via inflatable life rafts. The vertical fin was blown off with explosives, as it disrupted airport operations. The aircraft was recovered from the harbor days later and was written off.
 On December 11, 1994, Philippine Airlines Flight 434, a  747-283B was seriously damaged by a bomb, killing one passenger and damaging vital control systems. The bombing was a test run of the unsuccessful Bojinka terrorist attacks. The Boeing 747 (tail number EI-BWF) was flying the second leg of a route from Ninoy Aquino International Airport to Narita International Airport, in Tokyo, Japan, with a stop at Mactan–Cebu International Airport in the Philippines. After the bomb detonated, 58-year-old veteran pilot Captain Eduardo "Ed" Reyes was able to land the aircraft, saving it and the remaining passengers and crew.
 On December 20, 1995, Tower Air Flight 41, a 747-100, veered off the left side of runway 4L during an attempted takeoff at John F. Kennedy International Airport (JFK), New York City, New York. The flight was a regularly scheduled passenger/cargo flight conducted under the provisions of Title 14 Code of Federal Regulations Part 121. Of the 468 persons aboard (451 passengers, 12 cabin crewmembers, three flight crew members, and two cockpit jumpseat occupants), 24 passengers sustained minor injuries, and a flight attendant received serious injuries. The aircraft was damaged beyond repair.
 On July 17, 1996, TWA Flight 800, a 747-100 bound for Charles de Gaulle Airport in Paris, exploded during its climb from JFK in New York, killing all 230 people aboard. A spark from a wire in the center fuel tank is believed to have caused the explosion. Changes in fuel tank management were adopted after the crash.
 On November 12, 1996, Saudi Arabian Airlines Flight 763, a 747-100B, collided with Kazakhstan Airlines Flight 1907, an Ilyushin Il-76, in midair over Charkri Dadri in Haryana, India, resulting in the deaths of all 349 occupants of both aircraft, the deadliest midair collision in history.
 On August 6, 1997, Korean Air Flight 801, a Boeing 747-300, crashed into a hillside while on approach to Antonio B. Won Pat International Airport on the island of Guam due to pilot error. Of the 254 people on board, 26 survived.
 On December 27, 1997, a Pakistan Airlines Boeing 747 plane from Karachi to London, crashed when landing at Dubai international airport. It overshot the runway and went through the perimeter wall. No one was killed.
 On August 5, 1998, Korean Air Flight 8702, a Boeing 747-400, overshot a runway while landing. The fuselage split and 25 people were injured.
 On March 5, 1999, Air France flight 6745, a 747-2B3F (F-GPAN) carrying 66 tons of cargo from Paris Charles de Gaulle Airport to Madras International Airport, Madras via Karachi and Bangalore HAL Airport, was destroyed by fire after landing with the nose gear up. No fatalities occurred.
 On December 22, 1999, Korean Air Cargo Flight 8509, a 747-200F from London Stansted Airport, crashed shortly after take-off, killing all four crew. The captain of the aircraft had mishandled it due to erroneous indications on his attitude indicator.

2000s
 On October 31, 2000, Singapore Airlines Flight 006, a 747-400 flying from Singapore to Los Angeles via Taipei, collided with construction equipment while attempting to take off from a closed runway at Taiwan's Chiang Kai-shek International Airport (now Taiwan Taoyuan International Airport), killing 79 passengers and four crew members on board. There were 96 survivors, including all three pilots.
 On August 23, 2001, Saudia Flight 3830 a, 747-300, rolled into a drainage ditch at Kuala Lumpur Airport and toppled forward, causing severe damage to the nose section. Reportedly, the aircraft was being taxied by a ground engineer on the number two and -three engines. When trying to make a turn, the brakes and steering had no effect, and the aircraft continued into the ditch. The auxiliary hydraulic pumps, which actuated brakes and steering, were thought to be switched off.
 On November 27, 2001, an MK Airlines 747-200F crashed about 700 m short of the runway near Port Harcourt Airport, Nigeria. Of the 13 on board, one died.
 On May 25, 2002, China Airlines Flight 611, a 747-200B en route to Hong Kong International Airport from Chiang Kai-shek International Airport, broke up in midair 20 minutes after take-off and crashed into the Taiwan Strait, killing all 225 occupants on board. Subsequent investigation determined the cause to be metal fatigue cracking due to an improperly performed repair after a tail strike.
 On October 14, 2004, MK Airlines Flight 1602, a 747-200F, crashed while attempting to take off from Halifax Stanfield International Airport, killing all seven on board. The aircraft's take-off weight had been incorrectly calculated, and it was only airborne briefly before stalling at the end of the runway.
On November 7, 2004, an Air Atlanta Boeing 747 freighter was taking off but airport tower workers noticed a fire in one of the engines. There was also a loud sound at around the same time and the aircraft crashed.
On Jan 24, 2005, Atlas Air Flight 8995, a Boeing 747, was operated on a cargo flight from Dubai to Düsseldorf on behalf of Emirates. The en route part of the flight was uneventful. The flight crew established radio contact with Düsseldorf Radar at 05:43. The crew were told that runway 23L was in use.
Two minutes later, the radar controller contacted flight 8995: "I just talked to the tower and ah for the time being braking action on all parts of the runway is supposed to be good. They are measuring again right now because it started to snow again and I'll keep you advised." The flight was then cleared to descend to FL80. The flight crew decided to set the autobrakes for landing on Medium, to account for the snow.
At 05:50 the radar controller again contacted the flight about the current weather circumstances: "...latest update on the weather situation ahm the friction tester has reported braking action to be good for the moment, however as it's continuing to snow, they are ah afraid that it might worsen, so they are going to do another friction test right before you land." In the following minutes, the flight was given descent instructions and vectors for an approach to runway 23L. At 05:54, the controller radioed: "weather update we now have a surface wind of 340 degrees, 11 knots, that's slight tail wind component by 2 knots. Visibility is down to 1500 m, still in snow showers and ah cloud base is now 500 feet only." The flight was subsequently cleared for the approach. At 05:57, the radar controller instructed the crew to contact Düsseldorf Tower. The tower controller stated: "Good morning,... we are just waiting for the braking action values from the friction tester stand by a second. The surface wind is actually 330 degrees, 12 knots." Two minutes later, the controller radioed: "... the braking action was measured to be medium at all parts. And ah the visibility dropped right now due to the heavy snow showers at the field ah. The RVR value at the touch-down zone is presently 900 m, at the midpoint 1100 m and ah stop end 1100 m." At that moment, the flight was 3.5 nautical miles out. The flight was subsequently cleared to land. The airplane touched down about 1700 ft (518 m) past the runway threshold. Ground spoilers and thrust reversers deployed and the auto brakes activated. Still, the airplane did not decelerate as expected, and the pilot applied manual braking. The airplane failed to stop and overran the runway end. It collided with ILS aerials, which caused a fire in engines two and three. The aircraft was withdrawn from use at Düsseldorf until being scrapped there in April 2006.
 On June 7, 2006, Tradewinds Airlines Flight 444, a 747-200F, aborted a take-off from Rionegro/Medellín-José María Córdova Airport and overran the runway. The aircraft was damaged beyond repair and withdrawn from service.

 On May 25, 2008, Kalitta Air Flight 207, a 747-200F, suffered a bird strike during take-off from Brussels Airport, Belgium. The crew aborted take-off, but the aircraft was unable to stop before it overran the runway and broke up, with no injuries. 
 On July 7, 2008, Centurion Air Cargo Flight 164, a 747-200F, crashed into a farm field near the small village of Madrid, Colombia, shortly after take-off from El Dorado International Airport. The crew had reported an engine fire and were attempting to return to the airport. One of the aircraft's engines hit a farmhouse and killed two people inside it.
 On September 4, 2009, Air India Flight 829, a 747-400, suffered an engine fire at Chhatrapati Shivaji Maharaj International Airport, Mumbai, shortly before take-off. None of the 213 passengers and 16 crew was injured or killed, but the aircraft was written off.

2010s
 On September 3, 2010, UPS Airlines Flight 6, a 747-400F, crashed near Dubai International Airport, killing two crew members. The crash was blamed on lithium-ion batteries in the cargo hold that caught fire.
 On July 28, 2011, Asiana Airlines Flight 991, a 747-400F, caught fire and crashed in the sea near Jeju island, killing both crew members.
 On April 29, 2013, National Airlines Flight 102, 747-400BCF, stalled and crashed shortly after taking off from Bagram Airfield in Bagram, killing all seven crew members.
 On December 22, 2013, the right wing on British Airways Flight 34, a Boeing 747-436 registered as G-BNLL, struck a building at O. R. Tambo International Airport in Johannesburg while taxiing on the wrong taxiway.  Both the aircraft's wing and the building sustained severe damage, but  no injuries occurred amongst the crew or 189 passengers, although four on the ground were injured.  The aircraft was officially written off in February 2014.
 On March 19, 2015, 7O-YMN, a 747-SP used by the president of Yemen, was damaged by gunfire from troops loyal to deposed president Ali Abdullah Saleh. Photos released a few months later showed the remains of the destroyed aircraft.
 On June 16, 2015, Delta Air Lines Flight 159, a 747-400 (N664US) was en route from Detroit Metropolitan Airport to Incheon International Airport in Seoul. About two and a half hours from landing, the flight encountered a hailstorm that caused damage to the radome and leading edges on the wings. Additionally there was severe turbulence that caused items to fall inside the cabin, although no injuries were reported. The aircraft eventually had temporary repairs made in order for the aircraft to fly to storage at Pinal Airpark in Marana, Arizona on July 10, 2015. It was determined that it was not economically feasible to complete repairs, and the aircraft was scrapped in 2016.
 On January 16, 2017, Turkish Airlines Flight 6491, a 747-400F operated by ACT Airlines en route from Hong Kong to Istanbul via Bishkek, Kyrgyzstan, overshot the runway on landing in thick fog at Manas International Airport in Bishkek and caught fire; 39 people died, including all four crew members, as well as 35 residents of a village at the crash site.
On November 7, 2018, Sky Lease Cargo Flight 4854, a 747-400F, overran the runway while landing at Halifax Stanfield International Airport. The aircraft sustained substantial damage but all four occupants survived, 3 with minor injuries.

2020s

 On August 27, 2020, A Boeing 747-SP belonging to Las Vegas Sands Corporation was damaged beyond repair by Hurricane Laura while stored at Chennault International Airport in Louisiana, U.S.  The tip of the right wing struck a steel beam, causing the tip to separate. The nose section of the aircraft was also damaged by the wing of another aircraft stored at the airport.

References